Ruby Mountain, locally known as Old Volcano, is a cinder cone in Stikine Region, British Columbia, Canada, located  northeast of Atlin and  south of Mount Barham. A recent collapse on the volcano's eastern side created a large landslide which dissects this side of Ruby Mountain. The volcano is the largest feature within the Atlin Volcanic Field.

November 8, 1898 eruption

Miners working in the area were said to be able to work during the dark nights under the glow of the eruption. However, there has been no evidence found, such as lava flows young enough to have been the site of a historical eruption.

See also
 Atlin Volcanic Field
 Volcanism of Canada
 Volcanism of Western Canada
 List of Northern Cordilleran volcanoes
 List of volcanoes in Canada

References
 Volcano World: Ruby Mountain
 
 

Volcanoes of British Columbia
One-thousanders of British Columbia
Northern Cordilleran Volcanic Province
Atlin District